A conidium, sometimes termed an asexual chlamydospore or chlamydoconidium, is an asexual, non-motile spore of a fungus. The word conidium comes from the Ancient Greek word for dust, . They are also called mitospores due to the way they are generated through the cellular process of mitosis. They are produced exogenously. The two new haploid cells are genetically identical to the haploid parent, and can develop into new organisms if conditions are favorable, and serve in biological dispersal.

Asexual reproduction in ascomycetes (the phylum Ascomycota) is by the formation of conidia, which are borne on specialized stalks called conidiophores. The morphology of these specialized conidiophores is often distinctive between species and, before the development of molecular techniques at the end of the 20th century, was widely used for identification of (e.g. Metarhizium) species.

The terms microconidia and macroconidia are sometimes used.

Conidiogenesis
There are two main types of conidium development:
 Blastic conidiogenesis, where the spore is already evident before it separates from the conidiogenic hypha which is giving rise to it, and
 Thallic conidiogenesis, where first a cross-wall appears and thus the created cell develops into a spore.

Conidia germination

A conidium may form germ tubes (germination tubes) and/or conidial anastomosis tubes (CATs) in specific conditions. These two are some of the specialized hyphae that are formed by fungal conidia. The germ tubes will grow to form the hyphae and fungal mycelia. The conidial anastomosis tubes are morphologically and physiologically distinct from germ tubes. After conidia are induced to form conidial anastomosis tubes, they grow homing toward each other, and they fuse.  Once fusion happens, the nuclei can pass through fused CATs. These are events of fungal vegetative growth and not sexual reproduction. Fusion between these cells seems to be important for some fungi during early stages of colony establishment. The production of these cells has been suggested to occur in 73 different species of fungi.

Structures for release of conidia
Conidiogenesis is an important mechanism of spread of plant pathogens.  In some cases, specialized macroscopic fruiting structures perhaps 1 mm or so in diameter containing masses of conidia are formed under the skin of the host plant and then erupt through the surface, allowing the spores to be distributed by wind and rain.  One of these structures is called a conidioma (plural: conidiomata).

Two important types of conidiomata, distinguished by their form, are:
pycnidia (singular: pycnidium), which are flask-shaped, and
acervuli (singular: acervulus), which have a simpler cushion-like form.

Pycnidial conidiomata or pycnidia form in the fungal tissue itself, and are shaped like a bulging vase. The conidia are released through a small opening at the apex, the ostiole.

Acervular conidiomata, or acervuli, are cushion-like structures that form within the tissues of a host organism:
subcuticular, lying under the outer layer of the plant (the cuticle),
intraepidermal, inside the outer cell layer (the epidermis),
subepidermal, under the epidermis, or deeper inside the host.

Mostly they develop a flat layer of relatively short conidiophores which then produce masses of spores.  The increasing pressure leads to the splitting of the epidermis and cuticle and allows release of the conidia from the tissue.

Health issues
Conidia are always present in the air, but levels fluctuate from day to day and with the seasons. An average person inhales at least 40 conidia per hour.
Exposure to conidia from certain species, such as those of Cryptostroma corticale, is known to cause hypersensitivity pneumonitis, an occupational hazard for forest workers and paper mill employees.

Conidia are often the method by which some normally harmless but heat-tolerating (thermotolerant), common fungi establish infection in certain types of severely immunocompromised patients (usually acute leukemia patients on induction chemotherapy, AIDS patients with superimposed B-cell lymphoma, bone marrow transplantation patients (taking immunosuppressants), or major organ transplant patients with graft versus host disease). Their immune system is not strong enough to fight off the fungus, and it may, for example, colonise the lung, resulting in a pulmonary infection.

See also

Arthroconidium
Ascocarp
Basidiocarp
Budding
Gemma
Phialide

References

External links
 

Fungal morphology and anatomy